The Tinoasa is a right tributary of the Pârâul Câinelui in Romania. It discharges into the Pârâul Câinelui in Mavrodin.

References

Rivers of Romania
Rivers of Teleorman County